"Love Race" is a song by American rock musician Machine Gun Kelly featuring Sleeping with Sirens vocalist Kellin Quinn, released through Bad Boy Records and Interscope Records on April 29, 2021. Much like his pop punk album Tickets to My Downfall (2020), the song features drummer Travis Barker. "Love Race" was later included on the European and Japanese editions of his sixth studio album Mainstream Sellout (2022).

Background and recording
The song was released on April 29, 2021. The song features drumming by Travis Barker, who had previously drummed on Kelly's 2020 pop punk album Tickets to My Downfall. Barker also provided production on the track, while Jared Gutstadt and Jeff Peters of Audio Chateau helped write the song. The song also received an unexplained writing credit to Matthew Thiessen of the rock band Relient K. The song features vocals from Kellin Quinn of the rock band Sleeping with Sirens. The song was the third collaboration between Kelly and Quinn, the prior being a remix of Rise Against's single "Swing Life Away". Kelly noted that he improvised his lyrics for the song and had his parts done in five minutes.

Themes and composition
Publications generally described the song as pop punk and similar in nature to the material found in Kelly's Tickets to My Downfall (2020) album. Guitar World described the song as having a "syncopated, reverb-heavy guitar line" in the song's verses that eventually builds into chorus of powerchord guitars and vocal hooks. The song features alternating lower pitched hoarse vocals by Kelly, and higher pitched vocals by Quinn, with the song's second half containing segments of them singing concurrently.

Reception
Both Billboard and Guitar World publications highlighted the song as a standout single release in its release week. Exclaim! noted that Baker's voice was less grating next to Quinn's voice, but noted that "the whole thing goes down surprisingly smooth".

Personnel
Credits adapted from Tidal.
 Machine Gun Kelly – vocals, guitar, lyrics, composition
 Travis Barker – drums, production, lyrics
 Kellin Quinn – vocals
 Jared Gutstadt – production, composition, lyrics
 Geoff Warburton – composition, lyrics
 Jeff Peters – composition, lyrics
 Matt Thiessen – composition, lyrics
 K Thrash – engineering
 Manny Marroquin – engineering, mixing
 Chris Gehringer – mastering

Charts

Weekly charts

Year-end charts

References

External links
 

2021 singles
2021 songs
Machine Gun Kelly (musician) songs
Bad Boy Records singles
Interscope Records singles
Kellin Quinn songs
Song recordings produced by Travis Barker
Songs written by Geoff Warburton
Songs written by Jared Gutstadt
Songs written by Machine Gun Kelly (musician)
Songs written by Matt Thiessen
Songs written by Travis Barker